Nematopalaemon is a genus of shrimps belonging to the family Palaemonidae.

The species of this genus are found in Southern Asia, Africa and Southern America.

Species:

Nematopalaemon colombiensis 
Nematopalaemon hastatus 
Nematopalaemon karnafuliensis 
Nematopalaemon schmitti 
Nematopalaemon tenuipes

References

Palaemonidae